Weightlifting has been a sport of  the Pan American Games since the 1951 games. Women's took place at 1999 edition.

Medal table

Medalists

See also
 Pan American Weightlifting Championships

References

External links
 Official PAWF website

 
Sports at the Pan American Games
Pan American Games